Jordan Abdull (born 5 February 1996) is an English rugby league footballer who plays as a  or  for Hull Kingston Rovers in the Betfred Super League.

He has played for Hull F.C. in the Super League, and on loan from Hull F.C. at Doncaster in League 1, and Featherstone Rovers and Hull Kingston Rovers in the Championship. Abdull has also played for the London Broncos in the top flight and played as a  earlier in his career.

Background
Abdull was born in Kingston upon Hull, Humberside.

Early life 
Abdull began his rugby league career at amateur club the Norland Sharks A.R.L.F.C. (in Hessle, East Riding of Yorkshire, of the Yorkshire Men's League), before moving to Skirlaugh Bulls ARLFC, and at school level he reached three Carnegie Champion Schools National Cup finals whilst at Sirius Academy.

Career 
After signing for boyhood club Hull F.C., he made his first team début against the Wakefield Trinity Wildcats on 29 June 2014, in which he kicked his first career conversion. Later that season he signed a new two-year contract with the club.
In the 2014 season, Abdull scored his first try for Hull F.C. against the Castleford Tigers in an 18–18 draw on 24 July. His form saw him gain a call-up to the England Academy side on 19 October 2014, alongside Hull U19s teammates Jasin Turgut and Callum Lancaster. He made 20 appearances in the 2015 season and scored a total of four tries. Abdull was given the number 13 shirt after Joe Westerman left Hull F.C. to join the Warrington Wolves.

He spend with 2017 season on loan with Hull Kingston Rovers in the Kingstone Press Championship.
Abdull joined the London Broncos for an undisclosed fee ahead of the 2019 Super League season.
In round 3 of the 2021 Super League season, he kicked the winning field goal as Hull Kingston Rovers beat Huddersfield 25–24.
On 24 July 2021, Abdull scored two tries and kicked five goals in Hull KR's 32–30 defeat against Catalans Dragons.
On 24 September 2021, the day after being  shortlisted for the Super League Man of Steel award,  Abdull scored a try, two conversions, a penalty, and a drop goal, being named the Man of the Match, in Hull KR's shock 19–0 away win against Warrington, to earn a place in the Super League Play-Off semi-final at Catalans Dragons.  Abdull played a total of 13 games for Hull KR in the 2021 Super League season including the club's 28–10 semi-final loss against the Catalans Dragons.
On 20 October 2021 Abdull was selected for his England debut against France. On 12 May 2022, Abdull was ruled out for the remainder of the 2022 Super League season with a ligament tear.

References

External links

Statistics at londonbroncosrl.com
SL profile
(archived by web.archive.org) Statistics at hullfc.com
(archived by web.archive.org) Statistics at hullkr.co.uk
(archived by web.archive.org) Statistics at hullfc.com
(archived by web.archive.org) Statistics at rugby-league.com

1996 births
Living people
Doncaster R.L.F.C. players
England national rugby league team players
English rugby league players
Featherstone Rovers players
Hull F.C. players
Hull Kingston Rovers players
London Broncos players
Rugby league five-eighths
Rugby league halfbacks
Rugby league locks
Rugby league players from Kingston upon Hull